Ernest Gasson (14 August 1887 – 3 March 1962) was a New Zealand cricketer. He played in six first-class matches for Canterbury from 1924 to 1926.

See also
 List of Canterbury representative cricketers

References

External links
 

1887 births
1962 deaths
New Zealand cricketers
Canterbury cricketers
Cricketers from Christchurch